Ethmia baja is a moth in the family Depressariidae. It is found in the Cape District of
Baja California, Mexico.

References

Moths described in 1973
baja